Bon Voyage is a 1987 album by McCoy Tyner released on the Timeless label. It was recorded in June 1987 and features performances by Tyner with bassist Avery Sharpe and drummer Louis Hayes.

Reception
The Allmusic review by Ken Dryden states that although the album is "Not one of McCoy Tyner's better known CDs, this trio session is nevertheless one worth acquiring".

Track listing 
 "Bon Voyage" - 10:27  
 "Summertime" (Gershwin, Gershwin, Heyward) - 6:11  
 "Don't Blame Me" (Fields, McHugh) - 4:31  
 "You Stepped Out of a Dream" (Brown, Kahn) - 8:51  
 "Walk Spirit, Talk Spirit (Listed incorrectly  as Jazz Walk)" - 7:41  
 "How Deep Is the Ocean?" (Berlin) - 7:12  
 "Yesterdays" (Harbach, Kern) - 4:57  
 "Blues for Max" - 4:39  
All compositions by McCoy Tyner except as indicated
 Recorded 9 June 1987 in Studio 44, Monster, the Netherlands, .

Personnel 
 McCoy Tyner: piano
 Avery Sharpe: electric bass (track 1), bass
 Louis Hayes: drums

References 

McCoy Tyner albums
1987 albums
Timeless Records albums